The 2016 Mongolian Futsal League also known as the Pepsi League is the 1st edition of the tournament. There are 12 teams from Khurkhree League and Khurkhree 1st League. The season was started in January 2016.

Pepsi League
The Mongolian Futsal League also known as the Pepsi League is then National Futsal Tournament of Mongolia. In 2015, the Mongolian Football Federation made the opinion for the League and in January 2016, the first tournament was begun.

Clubs

League table

Football leagues in Mongolia
Futsal League